The Starwind 223 is an American trailerable sailboat, that was designed by Cortland Steck and first built in 1984.

Production
The design was built by the Starwind division of Wellcraft Marine Corp in the United States from 1982 to 1984 and then by Rebel Industries near Sarasota, Florida from 1985 to 1987.

Design

The Starwind 223 is a small recreational keelboat, built predominantly of fiberglass, with wood trim. It has a fractional sloop, a raked stem, a reverse transom, a transom-hung rudder controlled by a tiller and a retractable centerboard keel. It displaces  and carries  of ballast.

The boat is normally fitted with a small  outboard motor for docking and maneuvering.

The design has sleeping accommodation for four people, with a double "V"-berth in the bow cabin and two straight settee berths in the main cabin. The galley is located on the port side just aft of the bow cabin and is equipped with a sink. The head is located in the bow cabin under the "V"-berth.

The design has a PHRF racing average handicap of 264 with a high of 261 and low of 270.

Operational history
In a 2010 review Steve Henkel wrote, "This attractive design ... has plenty of nice features ... and not a lot of faults. Best features: She has the biggest beam and hence the highest Space Index of her comp[etitor]]s. Marks of quality include a well-molded hull of mat, roving, and Coremat, with no chopped strand, a teak-and-holly cabin sole, cedar-lined hanging locker, anchor locker on deck, with a separate rope locker to help avoid tangle, a big Lexan translucent forward hatch for ventilation over the head, a sea hood over the main hatch to help provide watertight integrity, and a dinette table that attaches to either galley below or cockpit on deck. Settee and quarter berths are a generous 7' 9" long, and the wood-bottomed after cushions can be placed between the settees to make a cozy 6' 6" by 4' 4" double 'honeymoon' berth. Worst features: The inboard chainplates make it less easy to go forward on deck, but provide a tighter sheeting angle for the jib, so to most sailors the extra performance upwind is worth the slight inconvenience."

See also
List of sailing boat types

Similar sailboats
Alberg 22
Buccaneer 220
Cape Dory 22
Catalina 22
Capri 22
CS 22
DS-22
Edel 665
Falmouth Cutter 22
Hunter 22
J/22
Marlow-Hunter 22
Marshall 22
Nonsuch 22
Pearson Electra
Pearson Ensign
Precision 23
Ranger 22
Santana 22
Seaward 22
Spindrift 22
Tanzer 22
Triton 22
US Yachts US 22

References

External links

Keelboats
1980s sailboat type designs
Sailing yachts
Trailer sailers
Sailboat type designs by Cortland Steck
Sailboat types built by Starwind
Sailboat types built by Rebel Industries